Rajadih  is a village in Sheohar district of Bihar state of India.

References

Villages in Sheohar district